Detek is a village in Borsod-Abaúj-Zemplén county, Hungary.

Etymology
The name comes from Slavic personal name Dědek ("grand father", similar place names are e.g. Dědek and Dědkov in the Czech Republic). Terra Detk (1247).

References

External links 
 Street map 

Populated places in Borsod-Abaúj-Zemplén County